Ryan Flynn (born March 22, 1988) is an American former professional ice hockey player. He most notably played with Ilves of the Finnish Liiga. He was selected by the Nashville Predators in the 6th round (176th overall) of the 2006 NHL Entry Draft.

Early life
Flynn was born in Saint Paul, Minnesota. Prior to turning professional, he attended the University of Minnesota, where he played four seasons with the Minnesota Golden Gophers men's ice hockey team.

Career 
Flynn began his professional career with the Milwaukee Admirals of the American Hockey League.

For the 2012–13 season he played in Italy with HC Bolzano, scoring 28 goals and 20 assists for 48 points in 42 games played, and on September 7, 2013, it was announced that Flynn would be joining Ilves to play in the Finnish SM-liiga.

Flynn competed at the 2006 IIHF World U18 Championships where he won a gold medal as a member of Team USA.

Career statistics

Regular season and playoffs

International

Awards and honors

References

External links

1988 births
Living people
American men's ice hockey right wingers
Bolzano HC players
Ilves players
Milwaukee Admirals players
Minnesota Golden Gophers men's ice hockey players
Ice hockey players from Minnesota
Nashville Predators draft picks
USA Hockey National Team Development Program players